Leptonema illini is a species of bacteria. It belongs to the spirochetes and it is the only species of the genus Leptonema. It can be found in water and soil media.

Characteristics 
Leptonema are Gram-negative bacteria, very thin, helical bacteria of about 0.1-0.2 μm in diameter and 13 to 21 μm. length. They are usually unicellular, but can also be seen as short chains in growing cultures.

References

External links
Type strain of Leptonema illini at BacDive -  the Bacterial Diversity Metadatabase

Gram-negative bacteria
Spirochaetes
Bacteria described in 1983